TJF may refer to:
The Jared Foundation, a charity
The Jitsu Foundation, a national-level association of sports clubs headquartered in the United Kingdom with affiliated organisations in other countries
Thomas Jefferson Foundation, the governing and operating body of Monticello and its grounds as a house museum and educational institution in Virginia
Tom Joyner Foundation, an American foundation that provides financial assistance to students at historically black colleges and universities